Fred Ralston Hobbs (May 10, 1947 – June 24, 2010) was an American businessman and farmer.

Hobbs was born in Warren County, Tennessee and he moved to Eagleville, Tennessee, Rutherford County, Tennessee with his mother in 1949 after he death of his father. Hobbs lived in Eagleville, Tennessee with his wife and family. He was a cattle farmer, realtor, and auctioneer. Hobbs served as Mayor of Eagleville and also served on the Rutherford County Board of Education. He served in the Tennessee House of Representatives and was a Democrat.

References

1947 births
2010 deaths
People from Rutherford County, Tennessee
People from Warren County, Tennessee
Businesspeople from Tennessee
Farmers from Tennessee
Mayors of places in Tennessee
School board members in Tennessee
Democratic Party members of the Tennessee House of Representatives